Sulfatidosis is a form of lysosomal storage disease resulting in a proliferation of sulfatide.

Causes
It is caused by a genetic insufficiency of sulfatase enzymes.

Diagnosis

Types
Metachromatic leukodystrophy and multiple sulfatase deficiency are classified as sulfatidoses.

Treatment

See also
Sphingolipidoses#Overview for an overview table, including sulfatidosis

References

External links 

Lipid storage disorders